Haymarket Media Group is a privately held media company headquartered in London. It has publications in the consumer, business and customer sectors, both print and online. It operates exhibitions allied to its own publications, and previously on behalf of organisations such as the BBC. The company expanded outside the UK in 1999.

History
Haymarket began in 1956, under the name Cornmarket Press. Clive Labovitch and Michael Heseltine – later a Cabinet minister under Margaret Thatcher and Deputy Prime Minister under John Major – who had met at university, started out with the 1957 Directory of Opportunities for Graduates, and in 1959 relaunched Man About Town, which was to become an influential (if unprofitable) men's consumer magazine. The company failed in its relaunch of the British news weekly Topic, the title closing at the end of 1962, within three months of the takeover. The partners split in 1965, with Heseltine renaming his half of the business Haymarket Press to publish Management Today. In 1967 British Printing Corporation merged its titles into the company too. New titles included weekly Autosport, monthly Lithoprinter (later known as PrintWeek) and Gardener's Chronicle (GC). The company was renamed Haymarket Publishing; owing to its growing presence in online media and live events, it was rebranded as Haymarket Media Group in 2007. Haymarket has laboured under heavy borrowings since Michael Heseltine returned from politics to take the helm and to buy back large minority shareholdings from Lindsay Masters and Simon Tindall, who had managed the business in his absence. These borrowings were reduced to some extent by the sale of properties. The company is now managed by Heseltine's son Rupert.

Operations

Haymarket Business Media
This division provides news and information for professionals in areas including environmental management, horticulture, planning, medicine and marketing. These are generally subscription-only publications and, in all but a limited number of cases, are not available for sale via retail. The portfolio includes a number of magazines and websites: Brand Republic, Campaign, Clinical Advisor, COMPASS Online, Conference and Incentive Travel, DCP Online, DMNews, The ENDS Report, Event, FinanceAsia, GP magazine, Horticulture Week, Monthly Prescribing Reference, Management Today, Marketing, Marketing Direct, McKnight's Long-Term Care News, Media Week, MIMS, Planning Resource, PRWeek, Placemaking Resource, Renal & Urology News, SC Magazine, Third Sector, TASPO, Cancer Therapy Advisor and Windpower Monthly.

Haymarket Consumer Media
Haymarket publishes a number of automotive consumer magazines, all for sale by retail, and also a number of websites. The portfolio includes Autocar, CAT, Classic & Sports Car, and What Car?. The division was formerly a home to motoring photographic agency LAT Photographic.

In 2013, Haymarket sold Gramophone to Mark Allen Group.

In 2016, Haymarket sold its motorsport properties (including LAT Photographic) to Motorsport Network.

In 2018, Haymarket sold Practical Caravan, Practical Motorhome, FourFourTwo and What Hi-Fi? to Future and Stuff to Kelsey Media.

Wonderly
The Group's owned media agency.

Wonderly – formerly Haymarket Network – is the owned media agency launched by the global Haymarket Media Group in February 2019. It creates owned media across various platforms – print, digital and live. Services include strategic planning, editorial, design, print production, distribution, measurement and evaluation. Wonderly also has a dedicated digital design and build team.

Its clients include the British Army, Chartered Institute of Personnel & Development, Chartered Institute of Procurement & Supply, ECB, FA, IAAF, International Baccalaureate, KPMG, Tillington Group, UEFA, and Volkswagen.

Haymarket Exhibitions

Recent exhibitions include:
Autosport International (sold to Motorsport Network)
Cereals
Fruit Focus – The Fruit Industries Premier Event
Clothes Show Live (sold to SME London Ltd)

Worldwide
Haymarket entered the Indian market in 1999, becoming one of the first foreign-owned magazine publishers to do so. It produces content across print, web, and mobile in the US, Germany, India, and Hong Kong.

References

External links

Mass media companies of the United Kingdom
Privately held companies based in London
Year of establishment missing
Magazine publishing companies of England
Publishing companies established in the 1950s
1950s establishments in the United Kingdom